Genki may refer to:

Genki (company), a Japanese video game company
Genki (era), a Japanese era name
Genki (given name), a masculine Japanese given name
Genki: An Integrated Course in Elementary Japanese, a Japanese language textbook